Solute carrier family 22 member 14 is a protein that in humans is encoded by the SLC22A14 gene.

Function

This gene encodes a member of the organic-cation transporter family. It is located in a gene cluster with another member of the family, organic cation transporter like 3. The encoded protein is a transmembrane protein which is thought to transport small molecules and since this protein is conserved among several species, it is suggested to have a fundamental role in mammalian systems. Alternative splicing results in multiple transcript variants. [provided by RefSeq, Feb 2016].

References

Further reading